General Louis Wagner Middle School, formerly General Louis Wagner Junior High School, is a historic middle school located in the West Oak Lane neighborhood of Philadelphia, Pennsylvania. It is a part of the School District of Philadelphia.

The building was designed by Irwin T. Catharine and built in 1927–1928. It is a three-story, 15 bay, yellow brick building in a Classical Revival-style. It features a projecting center entrance bay with portico and Ionic order columns.

It was added to the National Register of Historic Places in 1986.

Students continue to King High School.

References

External links
 Gen. Louis Wagner Middle School

School buildings on the National Register of Historic Places in Philadelphia
Neoclassical architecture in Pennsylvania
School buildings completed in 1928
West Oak Lane, Philadelphia
Middle schools in Pennsylvania
School District of Philadelphia
1928 establishments in Pennsylvania